The Kang Chiao International School (KCIS) is  a private, coeducational school in New Taipei City in Taiwan. KCIS is a subsidiary of Kang Chiao Bilingual School.

Founded in 2002, KCIS provides an international education for local and expatriate families in Taiwan. KCIS currently offers an overseas college preparatory program for grades 7-12. The junior high section of the international school was registered and started to accept students in 2004. In 2009, the high school section was officially established.

References

External links 

Official website
WASC website
IBO website

2002 establishments in Taiwan
Educational institutions established in 2002
International schools in Taiwan
Schools in New Taipei